A skill is the learned ability to act with determined results with good execution often within a given amount of time, energy, or both. Skills can often be divided into domain-general and domain-specific skills. For example, in the domain of work, some general skills would include time management, teamwork and leadership, self-motivation and others, whereas domain-specific skills would be used only for a certain job. Skill usually requires certain environmental stimuli and situations to assess the level of skill being shown and used.

A skill may be called an art when it represents a body of knowledge or branch of learning, as in the art of medicine or the art of war.  Although the arts are also skills, there are many skills that form an art but have no connection to the fine arts.

People need a broad range of skills to contribute to the modern economy. A joint ASTD and U.S. Department of Labor study showed that through technology, the workplace is changing, and identified 16 basic skills that employees must have to be able to change with it. Three broad categories of skills are suggested and these are technical, human, and conceptual. The first two can be substituted with hard and soft skills, respectively.

Hard skills
Hard skills, also called technical skills, are any skills relating to a specific task or situation. It involves both understanding and proficiency in such specific activity that involves methods, processes, procedures, or techniques. These skills are easily quantifiable unlike soft skills, which are related to one's personality. These are also skills that can be or have been tested and may entail some professional, technical, or academic qualification.

Holistic Competency 
Holistic competencies is an umbrella term for different types of generic skills (e.g. critical thinking, problem-solving skills, positive values, and attitudes (e.g. resilience, appreciation for others) which are essential for life-long learning and whole-person development.

Labor skills

Skilled workers have long had historical import (see Division of labor) as electricians, masons, carpenters, blacksmiths, bakers, brewers, coopers, printers and other occupations that are economically productive. Skilled workers were often politically active through their craft guilds.

Life skills

An ability and capacity acquired through deliberate, systematic, and sustained effort to smoothly and adaptively carry out complex activities or job functions involving ideas (cognitive skills), things (technical skills), and/or people (interpersonal skills).

People skills

According to the Portland Business Journal, people skills are described as: 
 understanding ourselves and moderating our responses
 talking effectively and empathizing accurately
 building relationships of trust, respect and productive interactions.

A British definition is "the ability to communicate effectively with people in a friendly way, especially in business." The term is already listed in major US dictionaries.

The term people skills is used to include both psychological skills and social skills but is less inclusive than life skills.

Social skills

Social skills are any skills facilitating interaction and communication with others. Social rules and relations are created, communicated, and changed in verbal and nonverbal ways. The process of learning such skills is called socialization.

Soft skills

Soft skills are a combination of interpersonal people skills, social skills, communication skills, character traits, attitudes, career attributes and emotional intelligence quotient (EQ) among others.

See also
 Communication skills
 Competence (human resources)
 Deskilling
 DISCO - European Dictionary of Skills and Competences
 Dreyfus model of skill acquisition
 Forecast skill
 Game of skill
 Online skill-based game
 Procedural knowledge
 Transferable skills analysis

References

External links

American Society for Training & Development (archived 29 October 1996)
Australian National Training Authority (archived 11 June 2009)
NCVER's Review of generic skills for the new economy (PDF)
SKILLS EU Research Integrated Project

 
Learning
Knowledge